Joseph Henry Giebel (November 30, 1891 – March 17, 1981) was an American Major League Baseball catcher. He played for the Philadelphia Athletics during the  season.

References

Major League Baseball catchers
Philadelphia Athletics players
Savannah Indians players
Savannah Colts players
Baseball players from Washington, D.C.
1891 births
1981 deaths